Statistics of Primera Fuerza in season 1932-33.

Overview
It was contested by 10 teams, and Necaxa won the championship.

Group 1

Group 2

Relegation playoff

The relegation playoff was played between the last team of Group A and first team of Group B.

Moves
Before the start of the next season all the teams of Group B were dissolved (except México FC).

Top goalscorers
Players sorted first by goals scored, then by last name.

References
Mexico - List of final tables (RSSSF)

Primera Fuerza seasons
Mex
1932–33 in Mexican football